Harpers Ferry is a city in Taylor Township, Allamakee County, Iowa, United States. The population was 262 at the time of the 2020 census.

History

Harpers Ferry was platted in 1852; it was then called Winfield. In 1860, the name was changed to Harper's Ferry (with an apostrophe-s).

Geography

Demographics

2010 census
As of the 2010 census, there were 328 people, 173 households, and 106 families living in the city. The racial makeup of the city was 99.7% White and 0.3% African American.

There were 173 households, of which 13.3% had children under the age of 18 living with them, 57.8% were married couples living together, 2.3% had a female householder with no husband present, 1.2% had a male householder with no wife present, and 38.7% were non-families. 32.9% of all households were made up of individuals, and 19% had someone living alone who was 65 years of age or older. The average household size was 1.90 and the average family size was 2.33.

The median age in the city was 58.8 years. 10.7% of residents were under the age of 18; 4.5% were between the ages of 18 and 24; 10% were from 25 to 44; 40.8% were from 45 to 64; and 33.8% were 65 years of age or older. The gender makeup of the city was 51.2% male and 48.8% female.

2000 census
As of the 2000 census, there were 330 people, 166 households, and 110 families living in the city. The racial makeup of the city was 98.18% White, 1.21% Native American, and 0.61% from two or more races. Hispanic or Latino of any race were 0.30% of the population.

There were 166 households, out of which 15.7% had children under the age of 18 living with them, 57.8% were married couples living together, 6.0% had a female householder with no husband present, and 33.7% were non-families. 31.9% of all households were made up of individuals, and 22.3% had someone living alone who was 65 years of age or older. The average household size was 1.99 and the average family size was 2.44.

14.8% are under the age of 18, 1.8% are between 18 and 24, 18.8% are between 25 and 44, 28.2% are between 45 and 64, and 36.4% are 65 years of age or older. The median age was 58 years. For every 100 females, there were 90.8 males. For every 100 females aged 18 and over, there were 83.7 males aged 18 and over.

The median income for a household in the city was $29,091, and the median income for a family was $35,125. Males had a median income of $30,000 versus $21,250 for females. The per capita income for the city was $17,566. About 3.5% of families and 7.5% of the population were below the poverty threshold, including 24.4% of those under age 18 and 1.8% of those age 65 or over.

See also
Cota Creek

References

External links
 Effigy Mounds National Monument

Cities in Allamakee County, Iowa
Cities in Iowa
Iowa populated places on the Mississippi River
1852 establishments in Iowa
Populated places established in 1852